"Somebody else's problem" or "someone else's problem" is an issue which is dismissed by a person on the grounds that they consider somebody else to be responsible for it, or that it is "out of scope" in a particular context.

Examples

A 1976 edition of the journal Ekistics used the phrase in the context of bureaucratic inaction on low-income housing, describing "the principle of somebody else's problem" as something that prevented progress. Where responsibility for a complex problem falls across many different departments of government, even those agencies who wish to tackle the issue are unable to do so.

Referring to a team working on a computer programming project, Alan F. Blackwell wrote in 1997 that: "Many sub-goals can be deferred to the degree that they become what is known amongst professional programmers as an 'S.E.P.' – somebody else's problem."

Douglas Adams' SEP field

Douglas Adams' 1982 novel Life, the Universe and Everything (in The Hitchhiker's Guide to the Galaxy comedy science fiction series) introduces the idea of an "SEP field" as a kind of cloaking device. The character Ford Prefect says,

The narration then explains:

Adams' description of an SEP field is quoted in an article of "psychological invisibility", where it is compared to other fictional effects such as the perception filter in Doctor Who, as well as cognitive biases such as inattentional blindness and change blindness.

See also

 Abilene paradox
 Buck passing
 Bystander effect
 Externality
 First they came ...
 Inattentional blindness
 NIMBY (Not In My Back Yard)
 Other people's money
 Sheeple

References

Group processes
The Hitchhiker's Guide to the Galaxy
Perception
Problem solving

cs:Seznam pojmů, osob a vynálezů ze Stopařova průvodce po Galaxii#Pole problému někoho jiného
de:Hintergründe zu Per Anhalter durch die Galaxis#Problem-anderer-Leute-Feld